Colin Watson may refer to:
 Colin Watson (egg collector) (1943–2006), infamous British collector of protected eggs
 Colin Watson (footballer) (1900–1970), Australian rules footballer for St. Kilda
 Colin Watson (speedway rider) (c. 1896–?), British motorcycle speedway rider
 Colin Watson (writer) (1920–1983), British writer of detective fiction